TRNA-guanine15 transglycosylase (tRNA transglycosylase, transfer ribonucleate glycosyltransferase, tRNA guanine15 transglycosidase, TGT, transfer ribonucleic acid guanine15 transglycosylase) is an enzyme with systematic name tRNA-guanine15:7-cyano-7-carbaguanine tRNA-D-ribosyltransferase. This enzyme catalyses the following chemical reaction

 guanine15 in tRNA + 7-cyano-7-carbaguanine  7-cyano-7-carbaguanine15 in tRNA + guanine

Archaeal tRNAs contain the modified nucleoside archaeosine at position 15.

References

External links 

EC 2.4.2